Steve Adubato may refer to: 

Steve Adubato Sr. (1932–2020), American politician
Steve Adubato Jr. (born 1957), American media personality